Trauma is an American medical drama television series created by Dario Scardapane which was aired on NBC from September 28, 2009 to April 26, 2010. The series focused on a group of paramedics in San Francisco, California.

On May 14, 2010, NBC cancelled the series after one season.

Plot 
The series was about a group of paramedics from San Francisco, California.

Cast and characters

Main 
 Cliff Curtis as Reuben "Rabbit" Palchuck: Rabbit was given his nickname by a paramedic at the age of 13, for his speed and endurance as a runner. Rabbit survives a fatal helicopter crash that kills EMT Terry Banner and the pilot, Asher "Rotor" Reynolds. Rabbit often uses sardonic humor with his job and has a free-thinking rule-bending approach to things, of which his new pilot, Marisa Benez disapproves. When Rabbit attempts to show Marisa his gift of "not dying" by driving her home at a ridiculously reckless speed, inspired by the movie Bullitt, he accidentally clips a man's car door and severs his finger. The intoxicated man is convinced, with some help from Rabbit, that he himself caused the accident, a lack of ethics Marisa strongly objects to. Reuben's PTSD symptoms after the helicopter crash is revealed as a fear of flying. After receiving support from his friends and colleagues, he faces his fear by flying in an intense storm and surviving.  In "Blue Balloon", we learn that Nancy and Rabbit are a couple, and that both Nancy and Rabbit want to keep their altered relationship secret from the rest of the crew. This relationship began at "Thank You", when Rabbit went to Nancy's parent's house for Thanksgiving.
 Derek Luke as Cameron Boone: Cameron is a paramedic paired with Tyler Briggs. They often argue over trivial things but they typically enjoy a good working relationship. He is married with two young children and desperately tries to keep the horrors of his job from his home-life, while simultaneously feeling frustrated by not being able to vent the pressures of his job, even to his wife.  Boone has also been unfaithful to his wife, Sela, which she discovers. The two eventually agree to go to marriage counseling, but soon afterward when Boone responds to a shooting rampage in a lawyer's office, he finds that Sela is there being held hostage. After saving her life, he learns that Sela was in the office consulting a divorce lawyer. During Halloween, as they remain in place in the event partyers need assistance, Boone expresses disapproval of the homosexual community, leading to Tyler telling Boone that he himself is gay. When Tyler and Boone respond to an ambulance crash in which Nancy and Glenn are among the victims, Boone insists Tyler follow accepted triage protocol and attend to the most injured first. Because this involves his friends and colleagues, he feels guilty about his decision, but receives praise from his superiors for doing the right thing.
 Anastasia Griffith as Nancy Carnahan: Nancy, a medical school graduate turned paramedic, was originally paired with Terry Banner, a partner with whom she was having an in-work relationship when they responded to an electrocution on a rooftop. The easy run turned tragic when the rescue helicopter was destroyed in a tragic accident, costing Terry and the pilot, Asher "Rotor" Reynolds, their lives. The scenes depicting the event which took place one year previous are shown on the show's pilot episode. Her partner after Terry was Sam Bailey, who only appeared in the present-day scenes in the pilot. In episode two, Nancy is paired with a new EMT, Glenn Morrison, and exhibits her unacknowledged post traumatic stress disorder (PTSD) by her many one night stands. Nancy constantly teases and makes fun of Glenn for being a newbie, as does the rest of the team. The entire team made bets on how long it would take for Nancy to sleep with Glenn but their relationship has remained platonic. Nancy and Reuben "Rabbit" Palchuck are very close. Their relationship was strained when Reuben survived the crash that killed Terry, but while treating victims of a shooting rampage Rabbit takes a bullet for Nancy after she refuses to allow the shooter to kill one of the injured.  
 Aimee Garcia as Marisa Benez: One year after the fatal helicopter accident, young military veteran Marisa joins the SFFD as the pilot of the rescue helicopter where she is partnered with Reuben "Rabbit" Palchuck. Rabbit's rule-bending and often comedic style differs from her stern by-the-book way of working but she eventually learns to tolerate Rabbit's actions.
 Kevin Rankin as Tyler Briggs: Tyler and his partner Cameron Boone enjoy a good working relationship although they constantly bicker on a daily basis. Tyler was also a survivor of the fatal helicopter crash one year ago that killed EMT Terry Banner. Tyler still respects Terry's memory by even refusing to beat Terry's score on a video game. Tyler recently came out of the closet to Boone while posted in downtown San Francisco on Halloween. Tyler felt troubled over Boone's obvious homophobia, but since coming out to his partner they have managed to maintain their partnership and friendship.
 Taylor Kinney as Glenn Morrison: Glenn is brought in as a new EMT one year after the fatal helicopter crash that killed EMT Terry Banner. Glenn is partnered with Terry's former girlfriend, Nancy. Glenn puts up with a lot of nasty practical jokes and hazing by the other EMTs, who refer to him as "probie".  During a massive car accident at a town fair, Glenn wants to treat the driver who caused the accident last, but Rabbit reminds him that they are there to treat victims, not to decide who is good or bad. Glenn forms a close friendship with ER intern Diana Van Dine as they are both new to their jobs. That same day Glenn's distractions while driving to a softball injury cause his and Nancy's rig to be broadsided by an oncoming bus, leading to a massive accident. Glenn and Nancy are both hurt, but Nancy is injured more seriously with a lacerated spleen and internal bleeding. Glenn feels responsible for the accident, something he later confesses to Diana after she misdiagnoses Glenn's CT scan and Glenn ends up collapsing in a bar after getting into an argument with an inebriated Rabbit.
 Jamey Sheridan as Dr. Joseph "Joe" Saviano: Dr. Joe, or often "Joey", by Rabbit, is Chief of Emergency Medicine for the hospital. While fond of all of the paramedics, he is especially close to Nancy.  Nancy displays her innate surgical abilities by successfully repairing a torn artery in an impalement case with great agility. Dr. Saviano is impressed by her skills and encourages her to follow through with her training as a doctor. He writes Nancy a letter of recommendation for a residency rotation but two hours later Nancy and Glenn are brought in after their ambulance is broadsided by a bus.  Nancy suffers internal bleeding and requires a splenectomy. The Chief of Staff at the hospital (who just happens to be Nancy's father), finds the letter that Joe wrote and later confronts him in an elevator. He strongly implies that Joe has feelings for Nancy and that any relationship between them would be inappropriate. Joe is particularly tough on the new ER intern, Diana Van Dine. Near the end of the show, he is suspended by hospital administration for permitting Nancy to perform a Rapid Sequence Induction on an injured cheerleader in order to provide an airway, a procedure without which she would have died. Sadly, she is later found to be paralyzed. As a result, he goes on a drinking binge and is never seen again for the remainder of the show.

Recurring 
 Scottie Thompson as Dr. Diana Van Dine: Diana is a new ER intern at the hospital who, like EMT Glenn Morrison, is frequently the butt of her co-workers' jokes. Rabbit flirted with her until she gave him a firm "No". Diana eats lunch in the laundry room to avoid the nurses and other doctors. After Glenn joins her one-day, they realize—much to their surprise—that they are both natives of neighboring communities in the Lehigh Valley area of Pennsylvania. When Glenn and Nancy are later involved in a motor vehicle accident, Diana is instructed to take point on Glenn's hospital stay and she fails to double-check his CT scan. Later Glenn and a drunk Reuben get into an altercation at a bar and Glenn collapses. After a firm reprimand by the Hospital Board, Diana is once again discouraged about her career but Glenn manages to make her feel like one of the group after he and Nancy regain consciousness.

Production

A month after its premiere NBC announced it would not order any further episodes, but would broadcast the 13 episodes ordered. On November 19, 2009, NBC reversed its decision, announcing it had ordered three additional episodes of the series, bringing the order to 16 episodes; the order was extended to 20 episodes on January 20, 2010, as part of a package of episode orders that followed the demise of The Jay Leno Show. Trauma returned on March 8, 2010, with the season finale scheduled for May 10, 2010. In early April 2010, NBC reduced the episode order down to 18 and announced an April 26, 2010 finale.

On May 14, 2010, the show was cancelled by NBC after one season.

Filming
The pilot episode featured a multi-vehicle accident and resulting giant fireball, which were filmed in March 2009 on Interstate 280 in the Mission Bay neighborhood just south of downtown San Francisco.

All episodes included an air helicopter ambulance base station, San Francisco Fire Department Station 4, which in later episodes was located at a converted warehouse (Bldg. 180) on California Ave and US Naval Station Way, Treasure Island. The warehouse still stands, and still has "Angel Rescue Services" and SFFD logos on it. In earlier episodes the air helicopter ambulance base station was located at Naval Airship Square (helipad) by an abandoned Naval firehouse (Bldg. 111) on Pan American World Airways Esplanade and Avenue I, Treasure Island. Interior scenes were filmed on a converted sound stage in Hangar/Bldg 3 at 600 California Ave., Treasure Island. The ambulances used in production were manufactured in 2008 by MedTec Ambulance Corporation. They were trucked back to Los Angeles shortly after the show was cancelled. The two main production ambulances, 2008 Medtec Type III ambulances were sold shortly after, to Franklin Park Fire Department and Hamilton County Ambulance. The four other Type II ambulances were returned to their private leasing company.

The show has used places like Alameda Point for filming. One of the destroyed jets can be seen in Google Imagery.

Episodes

DVD releases

References

External links
 
 

2009 American television series debuts
2010 American television series endings
2000s American drama television series
2010s American drama television series
2000s American medical television series
2010s American medical television series
English-language television shows
NBC original programming
Television series by Universal Television
Television shows set in San Francisco